Small subunit processome component 20 homolog is a protein that in humans is encoded by the UTP20 gene.

References

Further reading